Las Charcas is a town in the Azua province of the Dominican Republic. As per a 2012 census, it had 12,345 inhabitants.

References 

Populated places in Azua Province
Municipalities of the Dominican Republic